Oniipa Constituency is an electoral constituency in the Oshikoto Region of Namibia. It had 23,913 inhabitants in 2004 and 14,236 registered voters . The constituency office is situated in the settlement of Oniipa. Further settlements in this constituency are Oshigambo, and Onanjokwe.

Omukwiyugwemanya is a notable fig tree at Oshigambo High School.

Politics
Oniipa constituency is traditionally a stronghold of the South West Africa People's Organization (SWAPO) party. 

In the 2010 regional elections, SWAPO's Johannes Sheepo Shiindi was elected as Oniipa's regional councilor with 95.5% of all votes cast in the constituency. In the 2015 local and regional elections the SWAPO candidate won uncontested and became councillor after no opposition party nominated a candidate. The SWAPO candidate also won the 2020 regional election. Vilho Nuunyango received 3,930 votes, well ahead of Mateus Elifas of the Independent Patriots for Change (IPC), a party formed in August 2020, who obtained 1,717 votes.

See also
 Administrative divisions of Namibia

References

Constituencies of Oshikoto Region
States and territories established in 1992
1992 establishments in Namibia